Alexander Vincent Sandusky  (August 17, 1932 – August 11, 2020) was an American football guard who played for 13 seasons with the Baltimore Colts of the National Football League (NFL).  Sandusky attended Clarion State College—now known as Clarion University of Pennsylvania.

References

1932 births
2020 deaths
People from McKees Rocks, Pennsylvania
Sportspeople from the Pittsburgh metropolitan area
Players of American football from Pennsylvania
American football guards
Clarion Golden Eagles football players
Baltimore Colts players